The 2023 Pacific Games, officially known as the XVII Pacific Games, will be a continental multi-sport event for Oceania countries and territories that is scheduled to be held in Honiara, Solomon Islands between 19 November and 2 December 2023. This will be the first time the Solomon Islands would host the Pacific Games.

The Games were originally scheduled for 16–29 July 2023. However, in July 2021, the Games organizers requested a date change due to delays in preparation for the games caused by the COVID-19 pandemic in Solomon Islands.

Host selection
Two countries expressed interest and launched bids for the 17th games. Tahiti, French Polynesia, which hosted the event in 1971 and 1995, was the first to express their intentions in hosting the 2023 Games during the Pacific Games Council (PGC) General Assembly in Port Moresby in July 2015. The other bidder, the Solomon Islands, in 2016 expressed interest with Prime Minister Manasseh Sogavare launching the country's bid for a potential first time host of the quadrennial event.  On 11 May 2016, during the PGC General Assembly in Port Vila, with the decision taken by the 22 members of the PGC awarded the hosting rights to the Solomon Islands. The margin of victory was reportedly a single vote.

Development and preparation

Participating nations
It is expected that 24 countries and territories are to participate: the 22 Pacific Games Association's (PGA), New Zealand, and Australia.

 (Host)

Sports
As amended in the Pacific Games charter on 14 July 2019, in Apia, Samoa, the programme of the Pacific Games shall consist of a maximum 24 sports. The following sports are scheduled for the games:

Calendar

References

 
Pacific Games by year
Pacific Games
2023 in Oceanian sport
Pacific Games